The Moshavei Yahdav (lit. the Together Moshavim) is a group of three moshavim located in the north-western Negev desert between Netivot and Ofakim and under the jurisdiction of Bnei Shimon Regional Council. They are:
Brosh (lit. "Cypress")
Ta'ashur (lit. "Larch")
Tidhar (lit. "Plane tree")

The three moshavim were all established in 1953 by Moroccan immigrants and refugees who were members of the Bnei Moshavim movement. They are all named after a passage from the Book of Isaiah, specifically Isaiah 41:19:
I will plant in the wilderness the cedar, the acacia-tree, and the myrtle, and the oil-tree; I will set in the desert the cypress, the plane-tree, and the larch together;

As the end, the passage describes the three trees set in the desert "together", from which the group takes its name.

References

Negev
Moshavim